The New Style may refer to:
 Naughty by Nature, formerly The New Style
 "The New Style" (song), 1986 single by the hip-hop group Beastie Boys

See also
Old Style and New Style dates